This is a list of international presidential trips made by Sooronbay Jeenbekov, the 5th President of Kyrgyzstan.

2017

2018

2019

2020

Gallery of visits

References 

Lists of diplomatic trips
Lists of diplomatic visits by heads of state
Jeenbekov